Naderabad may refer to the now abandoned city created by Nader Shah Afshar:
 Naderabad, Kandahar

Naderabad may refer to the following villages in Iran:
 Naderabad, Chaharmahal and Bakhtiari
 Naderabad, Ilam
 Naderabad, Kermanshah
 Naderabad, Kohgiluyeh and Boyer-Ahmad
 Naderabad, Markazi
 Naderabad, North Khorasan
 Naderabad, West Azerbaijan
 Naderabad, Maku, West Azerbaijan Province
 Naderabad, Zanjan